The 2018 All-Ireland Minor Hurling Championship was the 88th staging of the All-Ireland minor hurling championship since its establishment by the Gaelic Athletic Association in 1928. It is the primary inter-county hurling competition for boys aged between fifteen and seventeen. The championship began on 12 May 2018 and ended on 19 August 2018.

Galway were the defending champions and successfully defended the title after a 0-21 to 0-14 win over Kilkenny in the final on 19 August.	

The 2018 championship saw the biggest change in format since the introduction of the "back-door system" for beaten provincial finalists in 1997.

Format changes

At the GAA Congress in February 2016, it was decided by vote that the age limit for the inter-county minor championship would be reduced from under-18 to under-17. The motion proposed that all minor players at inter-county level be aged between 15 and 17. The change became effective from 1 January 2018.

At a Special Congress in September 2017, further changes were made to the format of the championship. Under the new format, the championship begins solely on a provincial basis in Munster and Leinster. There will be no Ulster Championship as Ulster teams, as agreed by the Ulster and Leinster Councils, will participate in the Leinster Championship. While it was expected that Galway would also join the Leinster Championship, they will remain as the sole Connacht representatives. They will enter the All-Ireland quarter-finals in a round-robin series with the beaten Leinster and Munster finalists. This will ensure Galway of at least two championship games every season.

Leinster Minor Hurling Championship

Tier 1

Tier one is the tier for the highest ranked teams, and operates essentially as a ranking round, as all four teams progress directly to the quarter finals.

Tier 1 Table

{| class="wikitable" style="text-align:center"
!width=20|
!width=150 style="text-align:left;"|Team
!width=20|
!width=20|
!width=20|
!width=20|
!width=30|
!width=30|
!width=20|
!width=20|
|- 
|1||align=left| Kilkenny ||3||3||0||0||7-70||6-36||37||6
|- 
|2||align=left| Dublin ||3||2||0||1||6-49||4-40||15||4
|- 
|3||align=left| Wexford ||3||1||0||2||3-43||3-55||-12||2
|- 
|4||align=left| Laois ||3||0||0||3||1-37||4-68||-40||0
|}

Tier 1 Rounds 1 to 3

Tier 2

Tier 2 represents the teams ranked 5 to 8 in the competition. The winner of this tier joins the four Tier 1 teams directly in the quarter final, while the remaining three teams progress to 'Preliminary Quarter-finals' to face the three Tier 3 teams.

Tier 2 Table

{| class="wikitable" style="text-align:center"
!width=20|
!width=150 style="text-align:left;"|Team
!width=20|
!width=20|
!width=20|
!width=20|
!width=30|
!width=30|
!width=20|
!width=20|
|- 
|1||align=left| Offaly ||3||3||0||0||9-69||1-38||45||6
|- 
|2||align=left| Kildare ||3||2||0||1||3-38||4-34||1||4
|- 
|3||align=left| Antrim ||3||1||0||2||5-34||4-45||-8||2
|- 
|4||align=left| Meath ||3||0||0||3||0-37||5-60||-38||0
|}

Tier 2 Rounds 1 to 3

Tier 3

tier 3 is for the teams ranked 9 to 11, and operates essentially as a ranking round, as all three teams progress to the 'Preliminary Quarter-finals'.

Tier 3 Table

{| class="wikitable" style="text-align:center"
!width=20|
!width=150 style="text-align:left;"|Team
!width=20|
!width=20|
!width=20|
!width=20|
!width=35|
!width=35|
!width=20|
!width=20|
|- 
|1||align=left| Westmeath ||2||2||0||0||10-33||1-13||47||4
|- 
|2||align=left| Carlow ||2||1||0||1||3-32||4-22||7||2
|-
|3||align=left| Down ||2||0||0||2||3-11||11-41||-54||0
|}

Tier 3 Rounds 1 to 3

Leinster Preliminary Quarter-Finals

Six of the seven teams in Tiers 2 and 3 play off with the winner of Tier 2 receiving a bye. The three winning teams from the preliminary quarter-finals plus the Tier 2 winners advance to the quarter-finals.

Leinster Quarter-finals

Leinster Semi-finals

Leinster Final

Munster Minor Hurling Championship

Munster Table

{| class="wikitable" style="text-align:center"
!width=20|
!width=150 style="text-align:left;"|Team
!width=20|
!width=20|
!width=20|
!width=20|
!width=35|
!width=35|
!width=20|
!width=20|
|- style="background:#ccffcc"  
|1||align=left| Limerick ||4||3||0||1||4-71||6-63||2||6
|- style="background:#ccffcc"
|2||align=left| Tipperary ||4||2||0||2||11-50||5-55||13||4
|- 
|3||align=left| Cork ||4||2||0||2||4-73||10-53||2||4
|-
|4||align=left| Waterford ||4||2||0||2||8-49||10-60||-17||4
|-
|5||align=left| Clare ||4||1||0||3||9-63||5-75||0||2
|-|align=left|
|colspan="10" style="border:0px;font-size:85%;"| Green background The top 2 teams contest the Munster Final.
|}

Round 1

Round 2

Round 3

Round 4

Round 5

Munster Final

All-Ireland Minor Hurling Championship

Quarter-Final Group Stage

Quarter-Final Group Table

{| class="wikitable" 
!width=10|
!width=170 style="text-align:left;"|Team
!width=10|
!width=10|
!width=10|
!width=10|
!width=30|
!width=30|
!width=10|
!width=10|
|- style="background:#ccffcc"
|1||align=left| Galway ||2||2||0||0||2-41||2-23||+18||4
|- style="background:#ccffcc"
|2||align=left| Kilkenny ||2||1||0||1||5-33||2-33||+9||2
|- 
|3||align=left| Limerick ||2||0||0||2||1-24||4-42||-27||0

|-|align=left|
|colspan="10" style="border:0px;font-size:85%;"| Green background The top two teams advanced to the All-Ireland semi-finals.
|}

Quarter-Final Rounds 1 to 3

Semi-finals

Final

Championship statistics

Top scorers

Overall

In a single game

References

Minor
All-Ireland Minor Hurling Championship